Love Is in the Air is a 2012 Italian comedy film directed by Fausto Brizzi.

Cast
Fabio De Luigi as Andrea
Claudia Gerini as Giulia
Filippo Timi as Max Lamberti
Giorgia Würth as Vanessa
Alessandro Sperduti as Simone
Virginia Raffaele as Juanita
Michele Foresta as Claudio
Michela Andreozzi as Daniela
Eleonora Bolla as Alice
Gledis Cinque as Martina
Yohana Allen as Jody
Alexandre Vella as Louis Lumière
Margherita Buy as Luigia
Pasquale Petrolo as the pharmacist
Enzo Salvi as Enzo
Franco Trentalance as himself

References

External links

2012 films
Films directed by Fausto Brizzi
Films scored by Bruno Zambrini
2010s Italian-language films
2012 comedy films
Italian comedy films
Italian 3D films
2010s Italian films